Rusby is a surname. Notable people with the surname include:

Cameron Rusby (1926–2013), Royal Navy officer, Deputy Supreme Allied Commander Atlantic
Henry Hurd Rusby (1855–1940), American botanist, pharmacist and explorer
Kate Rusby (born 1973), English folk singer and songwriter